Erigavo Airport  is an airport serving Erigavo, the capital of the Sanaag region in Somaliland.

Facilities

References

External links
 Aeronautical chart at SkyVector
 

Airports in Somaliland
Sanaag